Henry Morgenthau III (January 11, 1917 – July 10, 2018) was an American author and television producer, and scion of the Morgenthau dynasty and member of the Lehman family.

Biography
Henry Morgenthau III was the son of Elinor (née Fatman), granddaughter of Mayer Lehman, a co-founder of Lehman Brothers and Henry Morgenthau Jr., who was Franklin D. Roosevelt's U.S. Secretary of the Treasury. He was a grandson of US Ambassador Henry Morgenthau, Sr. and grandnephew of New York Governor and Senator Herbert H. Lehman. He was the brother of former New York County District Attorney Robert M. Morgenthau, as well as of Joan Elizabeth Morgenthau Hirschhorn (October 9, 1922 – October 1, 2012), who was professor of clinical pediatrics and preventive medicine and the associate dean for student affairs at Mount Sinai School of Medicine. A cousin was the American historian Barbara Tuchman.

Early years
He graduated from Deerfield Academy in 1935 and Princeton University in 1939. During his time at university, he ran on the cross country team, worked on Theatre Intime, and was an editorial-board member of the Daily Princetonian. Despite his family's social stature, Morgenthau was frozen out of bicker (excluded from Eating club membership) as a sophomore in 1937, along with four of the other 11 Jewish students in the class. During World War II, Morgenthau served in the US Army. From 1945, he was involved in the television business, at various times working as an author, producer and manager for the larger national institutions like NBC, CBS and ABC, while serving as President of Gannaway-Morgenthau Productions, Inc. From 1955-77, Morgenthau was a chief producer of WGBH (Boston).

His shows at WGBH won Peabody, Emmy, United Press International, Educational Film Library Association, and Flaherty Film Festival awards. He also served as acting program manager at WYNC. Morgenthau served as a vice president of the Eleanor Roosevelt Institute. He also was a manager of the Morse Communication Center at  Brandeis University.

Morgenthau III was producer of Prospects of Mankind with Eleanor Roosevelt (1959), The Negro and the American Promise (1963), and Conversation with Svetlana Alliluyeva (daughter of Stalin) (1967). He was a contributor to Screamers (2006 film) and story editor of A Tale of Two Christmases (December 21, 1952).

Authorship
He wrote Mostly Morgenthaus: A Family History (1991), focused on several patriarchs: The first Morgenthau of record, Moses (1773–1834), impoverished teacher of Hebrew from Gleusdorf in Bavaria, who later became a ritual slaughterer married to a rabbi’s daughter, was required to take a family name when the Jews of Bavaria were granted citizenship in 1813. Waiting in line at city hall in the predawn, he looked at the damp ground and decided to call himself Morgen Tau ("morning dew'' in German). His and Brunhilda Morgenthau's son, Lazarus (1815–1897) was making nicotine-free cigars, candy from pine needles, tongue scrapers, and gum-label machines. Married in 1843 to Seline Babette Guggenheim, he moved to Mannheim and opened a cigar manufactory, a business that grew rapidly when his brother Max (also called Mengo) wrote from California in 1849 suggesting he ship his cigars to the American market. Lazarus's success had been extraordinary, but the luck that had followed him could not prevent the business failure that followed the rise of protective tariffs in the United States when war broke out there in 1861. Financially overextended, Lazarus moved to New York in 1866, where his fortunes plummeted further. Lazarus's ninth child, Henry Sr. (1856–1946), saw his mission as restoring the family to its rightful position. As Wilson's ambassador to the Ottoman Empire (Turkey) during the crucial years before and during World War I, he supported the Jews in Palestine and heroically rescued Armenians persecuted by the Turks. Henry Jr. (1891–1967) was a close friend of both Eleanor and Franklin Roosevelt, FDR's Secretary of the Treasury and leader of U.S. efforts on behalf of Holocaust survivors. In his book Henry Morgenthau III casts doubt on the alleged Communist associations of his father's Treasury aide Harry Dexter White, whom Whitaker Chambers accused of being a Soviet spy and conspirator.

In 2016, at the age of 99, Morgenthau III published his first book of poetry entitled "A Sunday in Purgatory."

Awards
On May 9, 2015, at Marriott Marques Hotel in Washington DC, during the National Commemoration of the Armenian genocide Centennial Reception And Award Banquet, Catholicos Karekin II presented an award to Henry Morgenthau III.

Personal life and death
Henry Morgenthau III was an observant Jew who rediscovered his religion after his marriage to Ruth S. Morgenthau in 1962. Ruth died in 2006. They had three children together: Henry (Ben) Morgenthau (born 1964), cinematographer Kramer Morgenthau (born 1966) and Sarah Elinor Morgenthau Wessel (born 1963). Morgenthau turned 100 on January 11, 2017. He celebrated the occasion in Washington DC with 35 relatives and friends. 
He had six grandchildren: Edward, Henry, and Mizia Wessel; Osias and Mizia Morgenthau; Henry Morgenthau V.
Henry Morgenthau III died on July 10, 2018 at the age of 101.

References

External links
Dynasty

Henry Morgenthau III on Goodreads
U.S. Ambassador Henry Morgenthau's personal library donated to AGMA
Tribute To Henry And Ruth Morgenthau
Elinor Morgenthau
Mostly Morgenthaus: Family History
Timeless: Love, Morgenthau, and Me - by Lucinda Franks
Old Traditions, New Beginnings: Two Hundred Fifty Years of Princeton Jewish History: A Catalogue of the Exhibition Held at the Historical Society of Princeton and the Jewish Center of Princeton in Honor of the Center's Fiftieth Anniversary
Looking Back at the Morgenthau Legacy
Henry Morgenthau III Papers Relating to the Television Series "Eleanor Roosevelt: Prospects of Mankind", 1959-1962  
Henry Morgenthau III on Geni.com
WHITE HOUSE CRASHING 101
ACKNOWLEDGING THE MURDER OF A NATION
Amid Turkey's killing fields - An Armenian priest chronicles his four years in hell
Remembering a dark chapter in Turkish history
Ruth Morgenthau; refugee became presidential adviser
Documentarian bands with rockers to target genocide - Armenian ties drew Garapedian to System of a Down
Denying the 'other' Holocaust
Turkey finally hears its past
Henry Morgenthau interview, 1994 November
Joan Morgenthau Hirschhorn - Obituary

1917 births
2018 deaths
American centenarians
American people of German-Jewish descent
Jewish American writers
Lehman family
Military personnel from New York City
Henry
Princeton University alumni
Writers from New York City
20th-century American male writers
21st-century American male writers
20th-century American writers
Men centenarians